The Instigator is the second studio album by American country/rock band performer, Rhett Miller, lead singer of the Old 97's.  Miller's first album came more than a decade earlier. Miller is joined by idol Robyn Hitchcock on "Point Shirley" and the album's title comes from the song "The El."

Track listing
All songs written by Rhett Miller, unless otherwise noted.
"Our Love" – 3:32
"This Is What I Do" – 3:10
"Come Around" – 3:41
"Things That Disappear" (Miller, Jon Brion) – 3:23
"World Inside The World" – 3:45
"Point Shirley" – 3:09
"Four-Eyed Girl" – 2:28
"Hover" – 2:50
"The El" – 3:09
"Your Nervous Heart" – 3:47
"I Want To Live" – 3:40
"Terrible Vision" – 4:06
Japan-only bonus tracks
<li>"Erica the Beautiful"
<li>"This Is What I Do (Too)"

Personnel
Primary Musicians
Rhett Miller - vocals, acoustic guitar, electric guitar on "Our Love", "The El"
Jon Brion - backing vocals, electric guitar, bass, drums, piano, acoustic guitar, dobro on "Point Shirley", upright piano on "Four Eyed Girl", "Hover", B-3 organ on "Four Eyed Girl", vibraphone on "Hover", baritone guitar on "The El", "Your Nervous Heart", "talentmaker" on "World Inside the World"
Josh Freese - drums
Lenny Castro - percussion

Additional Musicians
Robyn Hitchcock - backing vocals, electric guitar on "Point Shirley"
Jim Keltner - drums on "Point Shirley", "Terrible Vision", percussion on "Terrible Vision"
David Garza - backing vocals, bass on "Four Eyed Girl", "distorto" guitar on "The El"
John Doe - backing vocals on "The El"
Dan McCaroll - drums on "The El"
Chrissy Guerrero - backing vocals on "Terrible Vision"
Karen Kilgarriff - backing vocals on "Terrible Vision"

References

Rhett Miller albums
2002 albums
Albums produced by Jon Brion
Elektra Records albums